"Appeal to the League of Nation Haile Selassie" is the name of a speech given by the Ethiopian Emperor Haile Selassie I on June 30, 1936 at the headquarters of the League of Nations in Geneva, Switzerland. The League allowed him to declare his case and his appearance before the assembled delegates was a moment in history that few who witnessed forgot. The speech concerned the fascist aggression during the second Italo-Ethiopian War in Ethiopia, where the emperor of Ethiopia mainly asked for the end of the war and for international treaties to be respected and for his extreme trust and conviction in the organization of the League of Nations, unity among peoples and nations. Selassie also protested the use of chemical weapons by the Italians.

In the discourse there is a part that knows prophetic, about what would have happened a few years later: 

Is the end of the speech:

Opening

Ravage and Terror

Country More United

Wal-Wal Pretext

Peace Efforts

Covenant Violated

Forced to Mobilize

What of Promises?

League Threatened

Assistance Refused

See also 
Haile Sellassie I

References

Bibliography

Further reading

 
 
 Haile Selassie I: Ethiopia's Lion of Judah, 1979, 
 Haile Selassie's war: the Italian-Ethiopian Campaign, 1935–1941, 1984, 
 Haile Selassie, western education, and political revolution in Ethiopia, 2006, 
 King of Kings: the triumph and tragedy of Emperor Haile Selassie I of Ethiopia, 2015,

External links
 appeal to the league of nations Haile Selassie June 1936(fulltext)
 discurso de Haile Selassie I ante la sociedad de naciones 30 de junio de 1936
 My life and Ethiopia's progress, 1892-1937: the autobiography of Emperor Haile Sellassie I
 la sociedad de naciones y el fracas de la seguridad colectiva, 1931-1939 Miguel Garcìa Campos grado en historia. Facultad de geografìa e historia. universidad complutense de Madrid(full text)
 Discurso de Su Majestad, Haile Selassie I, emperador de Etiopía, en la Asamblea de la Sociedad de Naciones, durante la sesión de junio-julio de 1936
 Haile Selassie, "Appeal to the League of Nations," Author Haile Selassie Date June 1936

 
Anti-fascism
League of Nations
1936 speeches
1936 in Ethiopia
History of Ethiopia